Jaylen Guy Twyman (born July 19, 1999) is an American football defensive end for the Miami Dolphins of the National Football League (NFL). He played college football at Pittsburgh and was drafted by the Vikings in the sixth round, 199th overall pick, of the 2021 NFL Draft.

Early years
Twyman attended H. D. Woodson High School in Washington, D.C. As a senior, he had 91 tackles and nine sacks. He committed to the University of Pittsburgh to play college football.

College career
Twyman redshirted his first year at Pittsburgh in 2017. As a redshirt freshman in 2018, he played in 13 games with one start and had 16 tackles and a half sack. Prior to his sophomore season in 2019, Twyman changed his number from 55 to 97 in honor of former Pitt defensive tackle Aaron Donald. That season he started all 13 games, recording 41 tackles and 10.5 sacks.

Professional career

Minnesota Vikings
Twyman was drafted by the Minnesota Vikings in the 6th round, 199th overall, of the 2021 NFL Draft. He signed his four-year rookie contract on May 13, 2021. Twyman was waived by Minnesota with a non-football injury designation on July 26. The next day, he was reverted to the injured reserve.

On August 30, 2022, Twyman was waived by the Vikings. He was signed to the practice squad one day later. He was released on October 4.

Miami Dolphins
On October 10, 2022, Twyman signed with the practice squad of the Miami Dolphins. He signed a reserve/future contract on January 16, 2023.

Personal life
On June 21, 2021, Twyman suffered four gunshot wounds when bullets hit the car he was riding in while he was visiting family in Washington D.C.

References

External links
Minnesota Vikings bio
Pittsburgh Panthers bio

1999 births
Living people
Miami Dolphins players
Minnesota Vikings players
Players of American football from Washington, D.C.
American football defensive tackles
Pittsburgh Panthers football players
H. D. Woodson High School alumni